Arizona State Prison Complex – Perryville is one of 13 prison facilities operated by the Arizona Department of Corrections (ADC). ASPC-Perryville is located in Goodyear, Arizona.

ASPC-Perryville's Lumley Unit houses the female death row.

In 1981, three units of the Perryville Complex, San Pedro, Santa Cruz, and San Juan (since renamed Lumley Unit), for minimum and medium custody male inmates was opened. In May 1982, Santa Maria Unit, for all custody levels of female inmates, began admitting inmates. ASPC-Perryville was converted to an all female facility in 2000. ASP-Yuma, a 250-bed adult male prison which opened in 1987 became a part of the Perryville Complex in October 1992 until November 1995 when it became its own prison complex Arizona State Prison Complex - Yuma. The Fourth of the housing units at ASPC-Perryville (previously San Juan) is named after Brent W. Lumley, an ADC correctional officer who was killed in the line of duty.

ASPC-Perryville has an inmate capacity of approximately 4,382 in 8 housing units and 2 special use units at security levels 2, 3, 4 and 5. The ADC uses a score classification system to assess inmates appropriate custody and security level placement. The scores range from 1 to 5, with 5 being the highest risk or need. ASPC-Perryville is a modern, mixed security prison.

History
By 2019 prisoners had reported opening packages of food products which stated that human beings were not intended to consume the items.

Death of Marcia Powell

Marcia Powell was a 48-year-old inmate who died May 20, 2009 after exposure to 107 °F temperatures for four hours in an outside cage at Perryville Prison. Prison policy limits such outside confinement to a maximum of two hours. An autopsy report showed that Powell had first- and second-degree burns and a core body temperature of 108 degrees. She suffered burn blisters all over her body. The county medical examiner found the cause of death to be due to complications from heat exposure.

Notable prisoners 
 Jodi Arias – murdered her ex-boyfriend Travis Alexander
 Marjorie Orbin – murdered her husband Jay Orbin.
 Pamela Anne Phillips – orchestrated her ex-husband's death.
 Brittany Zamora — sexually abusing a 13 year old student.

On Death Row
 Wendi Andriano – Andriano was convicted of the murder of her husband Joe Andriano. Her 33-year-old husband Joe was bludgeoned and stabbed to death in the couple's apartment in Ahwatukee, Arizona. His autopsy revealed that he had sustained 23 blows to the skull, and traces of sodium azide (a toxin similar in activity to cyanide) were also found in his system. 
 Shawna Forde – on May 30, 2009, 29-year-old Raul Flores and his daughter, Brisenia, 9, of Arivaca, Arizona, were killed at home during a home invasion by Forde, Jason Eugene Bush, and Albert Gaxiola.
 Sammantha Allen – on July 12, 2011, police officers were called to Ame Deal's home, where she was found dead in a small footlocker, having suffocated. Ame lived with a number of relatives, including her aunt and legal guardian, Cynthia Stoltzmann. Allen was Stoltzmann's daughter. The family first told the police officers that Ame was playing hide-n-seek and locked herself in the trunk the night before, after the adults went to sleep. During interrogation, Sammantha and her husband John confessed to locking Ame in the trunk as a form of punishment, because she took a popsicle without permission.

See also 

List of U.S. state prisons
List of Arizona state prisons

References

External links
Arizona Department of Corrections
Arizona State Prison Complex- Perryville

Perryville
Buildings and structures in Maricopa County, Arizona
Capital punishment in Arizona
Women's prisons in Arizona
1981 establishments in Arizona
Goodyear, Arizona